Mohd Nafuzi bin Mohd Zain (born 27 October 1978) is a Malaysian football coach and former football player. He is the currently head coach for the Malaysia Super League club Kedah Darul Aman.

Career
Nafuzi played in the Kelantan youth teams between 1996 to 1997. In 1998, he had an offer to play with Terengganu senior squads. With Terengganu, he won Malaysia FA Cup in 2000 and Malaysia Cup in 2001. After that, he transferred to Kedah which he had successfully won treble with them in 2007. Nafuzi signs with his former youth team, Kelantan in 2008.

As a national player, he also was part of the Malaysia squad at the 1997 FIFA World Youth Championship when Malaysia became a host tournament.

After retired as footballer, he ventured into coaching in 2011.

Managerial statistics

Honours

Player

 Terengganu 
  Malaysia FA Cup: 2000 
  Malaysia Cup: 2001

 Kedah
  Malaysia Super League: 2006/07 
  Malaysia FA Cup: 2007 
  Malaysia Cup: 2007

Head Coach

  Kelantan U21
  Malaysian President's Cup: 2015

References

External links

Malaysian football managers
Malaysian footballers
People from Kelantan
Living people
Kelantan FA players
1978 births
Malaysian people of Malay descent
Association football midfielders